Louis Angelo Riddick (born March 15, 1969) is an American football broadcaster and former player (safety position) who played in the NFL from 1991 to 1998, His brother, Robb Riddick, was a running back with the Buffalo Bills for eight seasons. His cousins, Will Lewis and Tim Lewis, also played in the NFL and hold management positions for professional football teams. He is an analyst for ESPN on Monday Night Football alongside Steve Levy.

Playing career
Riddick played college football at Pittsburgh.

He was drafted by the San Francisco 49ers in the ninth round of the 1991 NFL Draft. He also played for the Sacramento Surge, Atlanta Falcons, Cleveland Browns, Oakland Raiders, and Orlando Rage in his playing career.

Post-playing career
After his playing career ended, Riddick became a pro scout for the Washington Redskins for four years before being promoted to Director of Pro Personnel. He was hired by the Philadelphia Eagles as a pro scout in 2008. He was promoted to Director of Pro Personnel on February 3, 2010.

Riddick later joined ESPN as an analyst. In 2020, he became an announcer for ESPN's coverage of Monday Night Football.

In December 2020, various sources reported Riddick was being interviewed for the GM vacancies for both the Houston Texans and Detroit Lions.

In February 2022, the Pittsburgh Steelers announced that they would be interviewing Riddick for their GM vacancy.

References

External links
 ESPN Media Zone bio
 

1969 births
Living people
American football safeties
American football cornerbacks
African-American sports announcers
African-American sports journalists
Disney people
ESPN people
Pittsburgh Panthers football players
San Francisco 49ers players
Sacramento Surge players
Atlanta Falcons players
Cleveland Browns players
Oakland Raiders players
Philadelphia Eagles executives
National Football League announcers
21st-century American journalists